Kamurú (Camuru) is an extinct Karirian language of Brazil. It is sometimes considered a dialect of a single Kariri language.

References 

Kariri languages
Extinct languages of South America